FC Sochi-04 is a Russian football club based in Sochi. The club played in the South zone of the Russian Second Division in 2008. In 2009 it was denied license and won't play on the professional level.

FC Sochi-04 was founded in 2004 following the dissolution of FC Zhemchuzhina Sochi. The club entered Krasnodar Krai championship and finished sixth. However, they were given a place in the Second Division after a team from nearby Lazarevskoye, which was promoted to Second Division, was disbanded. Sochi-04 finished 7th out of 13 in 2005.

External links
Sochi-04 website 
Forums Football Club Sochi-04 (Sochi)

Sochi-04
Association football clubs established in 2004
Sochi-04
2004 establishments in Russia